Canavalin is a plant protein found in the jack bean, sword bean, and related plants. It is the major storage protein found in these plants' seeds, and is one of four proteins readily isolated from the seeds; the others are concanavalin A, concanavalin B, and urease. Canavalin is a vicilin protein homologous to phaseolin.

The crystallization of jack bean seed proteins has been studied extensively since the early 20th century and was of particular interest to 1946 Nobel Prize in Chemistry laureate James B. Sumner, though Sumner's group never fully characterized canavalin and it remained of little interest until its crystallization properties began to be studied in the 1970s. It was among the first reported examples of a protein whose tertiary structure contains two pseudo-symmetrical protein domains. Canavalin has since been used as a model system for studying protein crystallization, most notably in the study of protein crystal formation in space under microgravity conditions.

References

Plant proteins
Seed storage proteins